Corbu is a commune in Harghita County, Transylvania, Romania. The commune is composed of two villages, Capu Corbului (Hollósarka) and Corbu. 

The commune is located in the northern part of the county, on the border with Neamț County. The Bistricioara River and its right tributaries, Pârâul Vinului and Corbu, flow through the commune. 

Corbu is crossed by national road , which links Transylvania to Western Moldavia.

At the 2011 census, the commune had a population of 1,520; out of them, 84% were Romanian, 9% were Hungarian, and 5% were Roma.

References

Communes in Harghita County
Localities in Transylvania